|}

This is a list of House of Assembly results for the 1941 South Australian state election.

Results by electoral district

Adelaide 

 Preferences were not distributed.

Albert 

 Preferences were not distributed.

Alexandra

Angas 

 Preferences were not distributed.

Burnside 

 Preferences were not distributed.

Burra

Chaffey

Eyre

Flinders

Frome

Gawler

Glenelg

Goodwood

Gouger

Gumeracha

Hindmarsh 

 Preferences were not distributed.

Light 

 Preferences were not distributed.

Mitcham 

 Preferences were not distributed.

Mount Gambier

Murray 

 Preferences were not distributed.

Newcastle

Norwood

Onkaparinga

Port Adelaide

Port Pirie

Prospect 

 Preferences were not distributed.

Ridley 

 Preferences were not distributed.

Rocky River

Semaphore

Stanley

Stirling

Stuart

Thebarton

Torrens 

 Preferences were not distributed.

Unley

Victoria

Wallaroo

Yorke Peninsula 

 Preferences were not distributed.

Young

See also
 Members of the South Australian House of Assembly, 1941–1944

References

1941
1941 elections in Australia
1940s in South Australia